Major General Saw Tun is a Burmese military officer and retired major general in the Myanmar Army. He has served as Minister for Construction of Myanmar from 17 June 1995 to 2009. Saw Tun was one of the longest serving minister in the first cabinet of Than Shwe.

References

Burmese military personnel
Government ministers of Myanmar
Living people
Year of birth missing (living people)
Specially Designated Nationals and Blocked Persons List
Individuals related to Myanmar sanctions